Michel Bécot (born 10 October 1939) is a former member of the Senate of France who represented the Deux-Sèvres department from 1995 to 2014. He is a member of the Union for a Popular Movement.

References
Page on the Senate website 

1939 births
Living people
Union for a Popular Movement politicians
French Senators of the Fifth Republic
Senators of Deux-Sèvres
20th-century French politicians
21st-century French politicians